Dzzhe (Ԫ ԫ; italics: Ԫ ԫ) is a letter of the Cyrillic script. The shape of the letter originated as a ligature of the Cyrillic letters De (Д д Д д) and Zhe (Ж ж Ж ж).

Dzzhe is used in the old Komi and Ossetic languages, as well as in Grigoriy Vereshchagin's 1895 Udmurt alphabet. It was later abandoned, possibly due to its looking too much like "дк".

It is used to distinguish the affricate  from the sequence d-ž in some phonetic dictionaries.

Usage
This letter represents the voiced palato-alveolar affricate . It can be romanized as ⟨dž⟩.

Computing codes

See also
Cyrillic characters in Unicode

References